The .284 Winchester is a cartridge that has enjoyed a resurgence due to interest from long-range competitive shooters. Winchester has continued to produce brass cases for this since 1963. Introduced by Winchester in 1963, the .284 Winchester was designed to achieve .270 Winchester and .280 Remington performance from the new Winchester Model 100 autoloader and Winchester Model 88 lever-action rifles.

The result was a 7 mm cartridge with about the same overall length as the .308 Winchester but with a wider body, that yields a powder capacity about the same as that of the .270 Winchester and .280 Remington.

History
The Savage Model 99 lever-action, Winchester Model 100 autoloader and Winchester Model 88 lever-action rifles were available in .284 Winchester, and Ruger produced a small run of Ruger M77 rifles in this caliber.  Ultra Light Arms still builds Model 20 rifles in .284 Winchester.

Cartridge dimensions
The .284 Winchester has 4.29 ml (66 grains H2O) of cartridge case capacity. The case has a rebated rim and a body almost as large in diameter as that of typical belted magnum cases.

.284 Winchester maximum C.I.P. cartridge dimensions All sizes in millimeters (mm).

Americans would define the shoulder angle at alpha/2 = 35 degrees. The common rifling twist rate for this cartridge is 254 mm (1 in 10 in), 6 grooves, Ø lands = 7.00 mm, Ø grooves = 7.19 mm, land width = 2.79 mm and the primer type is large rifle.

According to the official C.I.P. guidelines the .284 Winchester case can handle up to 440 MPa (63,816 psi) piezo pressure. In C.I.P. regulated countries every rifle cartridge combo has to be proofed at 125% of this maximum C.I.P. pressure to certify for sale to consumers.
The SAAMI pressure limit for the .284 Winchester is set at 56,000 PSI, piezo pressure.

When the cartridge over all length is maintained, deeper-seating is necessary with long heavier bullets. This reduces usable powder capacity and hence performance compared to longer-action cartridges like the .280 Remington.

The American .280 Remington cartridge has probably the closest ballistics to the .284 Winchester. The .280 Remington has a lower  C.I.P  maximum allowed chamber pressure and slightly more case capacity.

Contemporary use
H4831, H450, H4350, H414, IMR-4350, and IMR-4831 are excellent powders.

These ballistics show that the .284 Winchester is as good as the .280 Remington with the same weight bullet. The short mountain rifles for which the .284 Winchester seems best suited seldom come with 24-inch barrels. Aside from Winchester, no other major company has ever loaded factory ammunition for the .284 Winchester.

The cartridge is sometimes used for long-range target shooting like F-Class and 1,000 yd/m long range competitions, where participants usually handload their ammunition. For this application the .284 Winchester is loaded with 175 and 180 gr very-low-drag bullets.

The .284 Winchester is not popular in Europe, where it competes with the 7×64mm, to which it is almost ballistically identical. When compared to the .284 Winchester the 7×64mm has a lower C.I.P. maximum allowed chamber pressure and, as a European 7 mm cartridge, has a slightly larger bore. European 7 mm cartridges all have 7.24 mm (0.285 in) grooves Ø diameter. American 7 mm cartridges have 7.21 mm (0.284 in) grooves Ø.

Wildcats

While it has been occasionally factory chambered in various rifles, the chief reason for its survival has always been wildcatting. Wildcats are not governed by C.I.P. or SAAMI rules so wildcatters can capitalize on achievable high operating pressures. With the .284 Winchester as the parent case wildcatters have created 6mm-284, 6.5mm-284, .284 Shehane, .30-284, .338-284,35-284, .450 Bushmaster and the .375-284 variants and the .475 Wildey Magnum pistol cartridge.

In those countries where restrictions prevent civilian use of firearms chambered in a Military cartridge, the .30-284 wildcat has been a favored option to convert military surplus rifles. Russian Mosin–Nagant and Swiss Schmidt–Rubin rifles, as well as 7.5×54 French MAS caliber rifles may be rechambered. The easiest way to do this is to rechamber the firearm to something that uses the same barrel bore, such as .30 cal. or 7.62 mm, but completely removes the old chamber during the process.  The C.I.P. has recognized and registered both the 30-284 NOLASCO, and the extremely similar (in the US considered a "Wildcat cartridge" based on the .284 Winchester) 30-284 Win.  Both these chamberings completely remove the original 7.5×54mm MAS chamber. They also both have the same C.I.P. pressure ratings as the 7.62×54mm MAS cartridge but differ in their overall length due to the length of the bullet - the NOLASCO carrying a longer bullet for better feeding and an improved ballistic coefficient, and to meet a somewhat more common European overall length of 76 mm, the same as the 7.5x54mm French and very close to the 7.5×55mm Swiss.

In 2008, the most popular and useful .284 Winchester-case based cartridge was not the original, but rather the 6.5-284 Norma. This former wildcat, made by necking down the original Winchester .284 casing to 6.5mm (.264), was developed for long range target shooting where participants usually handload their ammunition. At that time, it was one of the most used non-wildcat cartridges by match shooters in F-Class and 1000 yd/m benchrest long range competitions. In 2022, because of advancements in bullet design, the original Winchester .284 case has made a comeback as the most preferred cartridge in F-class competitions with other .284 caliber (7mm) cartridge variants being wildcatted off the venerable original design (e.g., .284 KMR, .284 Shehane, .284 Wheeler, .284 Ackley Improved).

Many owners of old Swiss service rifles in the United States are also now reforming .284 Winchester cartridge cases up to produce results analogous to the more expensive 7.5×55mm Swiss GP11 cartridge.

The Finnish cartridge company Lapua started making .284 Winchester brass (Product No. 4 PH 7284), again, since Spring 2021.

See also
 7mm-08 Remington
 7×57mm Mauser
 7×64mm
 7 mm Remington Magnum
 List of rifle cartridges
 Delta L problem

References

External links
 .284 Winchester in 7mm Cartridge Guide by AccurateShooter.com
 Obsolescent Rifle Cartridges by Chuck Hawks

Pistol and rifle cartridges
Winchester Repeating Arms Company cartridges